Pediapelta asmarensis is a species of tephritid or fruit flies in the genus Pediapelta of the family Tephritidae.

Distribution
Eritrea.

References

Tephritinae
Insects described in 1955
Diptera of Africa